A regressive tax is a tax imposed in such a manner that the tax rate decreases as the amount subject to taxation increases. "Regressive" describes a distribution effect on income or expenditure, referring to the way the rate progresses from high to low, so that the average tax rate exceeds the marginal tax rate. In terms of individual income and wealth, a regressive tax imposes a greater burden (relative to resources) on the poor than on the rich: there is an inverse relationship between the tax rate and the taxpayer's ability to pay, as measured by assets, consumption, or income.  These taxes tend to reduce the tax burden of the people with a higher ability to pay, as they shift the relative burden increasingly to those with a lower ability to pay.

The regressivity of a particular tax can also factor the propensity of the taxpayers to engage in the taxed activity relative to their resources (the demographics of the tax base). In other words, if the activity being taxed is more likely to be carried out by the poor and less likely to be carried out by the rich, the tax may be considered regressive. To measure the effect, the income elasticity of the good being taxed as well as the income effect on consumption must be considered. The measure can be applied to individual taxes or to a tax system as a whole; a year, multi-year, or lifetime.

The opposite of a regressive tax is a progressive tax, in which the average tax rate increases as the amount subject to taxation rises. In between is a flat or proportional tax, where the tax rate is fixed as the amount subject to taxation increases.

Examples
 Poll taxes
 Lump-sum tax
 A tax with a cap, above which no taxes are paid, such as the American Social Security Tax, which does not apply to wages over an annual limit.
 So-called "sin taxes" (pigovian taxes) have also been criticized for being regressive, as they are often consumed more (or at least at a greater proportion) by the poor Such taxes are often imposed at a flat rate so they will make up a greater proportion of the final price of cheaper brands, compared to the higher-quality products generally consumed by the wealthy. For example, "people in the bottom income quintile spend a 78% larger share of their income on alcohol taxes than people in the top quintile." Tobacco in particular is highly regressive, with the bottom quintile of income paying an effective rate 583% higher than that of the top quintile.
 An allowance reduction in an income tax system allows for an individual's personal allowance to be withdrawn, making a higher marginal tax for a limited band before returning to the underlying rate. In the UK, there is an effective 60% band at £100,000, which returns to 40% at £120,000.
 Non-uniform excise taxation based on everyday essentials like food (fat tax, salt tax), transport (fuel tax, fare hikes for public transport, mobility pricing), energy (carbon tax) and housing (council tax, window tax) is frequently regressive on income. The income elasticity of demand of food, for example, is usually less than 1 (inelastic) (see Engel's law) and therefore as a household's income rises, the tax collected on the food remains almost the same.  Therefore, as a proportion of available expenditure, the relative tax burden falls more heavily on households with lower incomes. Some governments offer rebates to households with lower incomes, ostensibly in an effort to mitigate the regressive nature of these taxes.
 A related concept exists where production and importation of essential goods are strictly controlled, such as milk, eggs, cheese and poultry under Canada's supply management system, the result being that the products will sell for a higher price than they would under a free market system. The difference in price is often criticized for being a "regressive tax" even though such products are generally not taxed directly.
 Payroll taxes, such as FICA and Unemployment Insurance in the United States, and consumption taxes such as value-added tax and sales taxes are regressive in that they both raise prices of purchased goods.  Lower-income earners save and invest less money, so pay a larger proportion of their income toward these taxes, directly for sales tax and as the price increase required to make revenue covering payrolls for payroll taxes.
 Property tax in regards to automobiles, better known as the "car tax" in some jurisdictions. 
 Lotteries have been described as a disguised regressive tax.

Implementations 
In 2005, the Swiss canton of Obwalden implemented a regressive taxation system. It was struck down by the Federal Supreme Court of Switzerland in 2007, because it ran counter to the Swiss Federal Constitution.

See also 

 Lump-sum tax
 Progressive tax
 Proportional tax
 Tax incidence
 Laffer curve
 Suits index
 Ghetto tax
 Progressivity in United States income tax

Notes

External links

Taxation and redistribution
Tax incidence